Apache Axis2 is a web service engine. It is a complete redesign and re-write of the widely used Apache Axis SOAP stack. Implementations of Axis2 are available in Java and C.

Axis2 provides the capability to add Web services interfaces to Web applications. It can also function as a standalone application server.

Why Apache Axis2
A new architecture for Axis2 was introduced during the August 2004 Axis2 Summit in Colombo, Sri Lanka. Some concepts from Axis 1.x, like handlers etc., have been preserved in the new architecture.

Apache Axis2 supports SOAP 1.1 and SOAP 1.2, and it has integrated support for the REST style of Web services. The same business-logic implementation can offer both a WS-* style interface as well as a REST/POX style interface simultaneously.

Axis2/Java has support for Spring Framework.

Axis2/C is a high-performance Web services implementation. It has been implemented with portability and ability to be embedded or hosted in Apache Httpd, Microsoft IIS or Axis Http Server. See article about Apache Axis2/C Performance (2008).
Latest release occurred on 2009.

Axis2 came with many new features, enhancements and industry specification implementations. Key features offered include:

Axis2 Features
Apache Axis2 includes support for following standards:
WS-ReliableMessaging
WS-Coordination  Via Apache Kandula2
WS-AtomicTransaction  Via Apache Kandula2
WS-SecurityPolicy  Via Apache Rampart
WS-Security  Via Apache Rampart
WS-Trust  Via Apache Rampart
WS-SecureConversation  Via Apache Rampart
SAML 1.1  Via Apache Rampart
SAML 2.0  Via Apache Rampart
WS-Addressing  Module included as part of Axis2 core

Below a list of features and selling points cited from the Apache axis site:
Speed  Axis2 uses its own object model and StAX (Streaming API for XML) .
Low memory foot print  Axis2 was designed ground-up keeping low memory foot print in mind.
AXIOM   Axis2 comes with its own light-weight object model, AXIOM
Hot Deployment  Axis2 is equipped with the capability of deploying Web services and handlers while the system is up and running. 
Asynchronous Web services  Axis2 now supports asynchronous Web services and asynchronous Web services invocation using non-blocking clients and transports.
MEP Support  Axis2 now comes handy with the flexibility to support Message Exchange Patterns (MEPs) with in-built support for basic MEPs defined in WSDL 2.0.
Flexibility  The Axis2 architecture gives the developer complete freedom to insert extensions into the engine for custom header processing, system management, and anything else you can imagine.
Stability  Axis2 defines a set of published interfaces.
Component-oriented Deployment  You can define reusable networks of Handlers to implement common patterns of processing for your applications, or to distribute to partners.
Transport Framework  We have a clean and simple abstraction for integrating and using Transports (i.e., senders and listeners for SOAP over various protocols such as SMTP, FTP, message-oriented middleware, etc.), and the core of the engine is completely transport-independent.
WSDL support  Axis2 supports the Web Services Description Language, version 1.1 and 2.0, which allows you to easily build stubs to access remote services, and also to automatically export machine-readable descriptions of your deployed services from Axis2.
Add-ons  Several Web services specifications have been incorporated including WSS4J for security (Apache Rampart), Sandesha for reliable messaging, Kandula which is an encapsulation of WS-Coordination, WS-AtomicTransaction and WS-BusinessActivity.
Composition and Extensibility  Modules and phases improve support for composability and extensibility. Modules support composability and can also support new WS-* specifications in a simple and clean manner. They are however not hot deployable as they change the overall behavior of the system.

Axis2 Modules
Axis2 modules provide QoS features like security, reliable messaging, etc.

Apache Rampart module  Apache Rampart modules adds WS-Security features to Axis2 engine
Apache Sandesha module  An implementation of WS-ReliableMessaging specification

Related technologies
Apache Axis
Apache CXF, other Apache web services framework (old XFire & Celtix)
Java Web Services Development Pack, web services framework
XML Interface for Network Services, RPC/web services framework
Web Services Invocation Framework, Java API for invoking Web services

Axis2 Books
Axis 2 knowledge base

References

External links
 
Apache Axis Homepage at the Apache Software Foundation
Apache Axis2/Java at the Apache Software Foundation
Apache Axis2/C at the Apache Software Foundation
Apache Axis2 Module Page
Web services using Apache Axis2
How to run an Axis2 client running against a Windows Web Server - Rob Austin

Axis2 Tutorial

Axis2
Web services
Web service specifications
Java enterprise platform